Kamlung Mossang is an Indian politician from the Bharatiya Janata Party.

Mossang was elected from Miao seat in the 2014 And 2019. In terms of educational qualification, he is a graduate (B.A.).

Mossang was one of 6 MLAs along with Chief Minister Pema Khandu to be suspended by the PPA for anti-party activities.

See also
Arunachal Pradesh Legislative Assembly

References

External links
MyNeta Profile

Indian National Congress politicians
Living people
People's Party of Arunachal politicians
Arunachal Pradesh MLAs 2014–2019
Year of birth missing (living people)
Naga people